The Lambda Literary Award for Debut Fiction is an annual literary award, presented by the Lambda Literary Foundation to a debut work of fiction on LGBT themes. Formerly presented in two separate categories for gay male and lesbian debut fiction, beginning the 25th Lambda Literary Awards in 2013 a single award, inclusive of both male and female writers, was presented. The award was, however, discontinued after the 28th Lambda Literary Awards in 2016.

The award was presented based on themes in the work, not the sexuality or gender of the writer; heterosexual writers were eligible for the award, and writers could be nominated in the "cross-gender" category based on the work.

Winners and nominees

References

External links
 Lambda Literary Awards

Debut
Lists of LGBT-related award winners and nominees
First book awards
English-language literary awards